Kathgarh is a town and union council in Dera Ismail Khan District in the North-West Frontier Province of Pakistan. It is located on the west shore of the Beas river, at an altitude of 173 metres (570 feet).

The town's location likely corresponds to the exact point where Alexander the Great crossed the river Beas or Hyphases. Alexander then built a new city, Alexandria of Hyphases, which is likely to be close to Kathgarth, but from the east side of the river. Alexandria of Hyphases marked the eastern border of the Macedonian Empire.

The coal mines of Dera Ismail Khan district are located in Kathgarh. Dhakki dates are also found in Kathgarh. Dates and Chuhara  made in Kathgarh are popular all over Pakistan and the region has its share in Chuhara exports to other countries as well.

References

Union councils of Dera Ismail Khan District
Populated places in Dera Ismail Khan District